The following is the list of Tinker Bell cast members. It features various actors who voice characters that have appeared in the Tinker Bell film series.

Cast

Note: A gray cell indicates character did not appear in that medium.

External links

 

Disney Fairies
 
Disney direct-to-video animated films
DisneyToon Studios animated films
Computer-animated films